DD Port is a station on Line 3 of the Dalian Metro in Liaoning Province, China. It is located in the Jinzhou District of Dalian City. The station is named after an industrial park based on Digital and DNA technology.

References

Railway stations in Liaoning